Michael Joseph Jackson (August 29, 1958 – June 25, 2009) was an American singer, songwriter, dancer, and philanthropist. Dubbed the "King of Pop", he is regarded as one of the most significant cultural figures of the 20th century. Over a four-decade career, his contributions to music, dance, and fashion, along with his publicized personal life, made him a global figure in popular culture. Jackson influenced artists across many music genres; through stage and video performances, he popularized complicated dance moves such as the moonwalk, to which he gave the name, as well as the robot.

The eighth child of the Jackson family, Jackson made his public debut in 1964 with his older brothers Jackie, Tito, Jermaine, and Marlon as a member of the Jackson 5 (later known as the Jacksons). Jackson began his solo career in 1971 while at Motown Records. He became a solo star with his 1979 album Off the Wall. His music videos, including those for "Beat It", "Billie Jean", and "Thriller" from his 1982 album Thriller, are credited with breaking racial barriers and transforming the medium into an artform and promotional tool. He helped propel the success of MTV and continued to innovate with videos for the albums Bad (1987), Dangerous (1991), HIStory: Past, Present and Future, Book I (1995), and Invincible (2001). Thriller became the best-selling album of all time, while Bad was the first album to produce five US Billboard Hot 100 number-one singles.

From the late 1980s, Jackson became a figure of controversy and speculation due to his changing appearance, relationships, behavior, and lifestyle. In 1993, he was accused of sexually abusing the child of a family friend. The lawsuit was settled out of civil court; Jackson was not indicted due to lack of evidence. In 2005, he was tried and acquitted of further child sexual abuse allegations and several other charges. The FBI found no evidence of criminal conduct by Jackson in either case. In 2009, while he was preparing for a series of comeback concerts, This Is It, Jackson died from an overdose of propofol administered by his personal physician, Conrad Murray, who was convicted in 2011 of involuntary manslaughter. His death triggered reactions around the world, creating unprecedented surges of Internet traffic and a spike in sales of his music. A televised memorial service for Jackson, held at the Staples Center in Los Angeles, was viewed by an estimated over 2.5 billion people globally.

Jackson is one of the best-selling music artists of all time, with estimated sales of over 400million records worldwide. He had 13 Billboard Hot 100 number-one singles (third highest of any artist in the Hot 100 era) and was the first artist to have a top-ten single in the Billboard Hot 100 in five different decades. His honors include 15 Grammy Awards, 6 Brit Awards, a Golden Globe Award, and 39 Guinness World Records, including the "Most Successful Entertainer of All Time". Jackson's inductions include the Rock and Roll Hall of Fame (twice), the Vocal Group Hall of Fame, the Songwriters Hall of Fame, the Dance Hall of Fame (the only recording artist to be inducted), and the Rhythm and Blues Music Hall of Fame.

Life and career

Early life and the Jackson 5 (1958–1975)

Michael Joseph Jackson was born in Gary, Indiana, on August 29, 1958. He was the eighth of ten children in the Jackson family, a working-class African-American family living in a two-bedroom house on Jackson Street. His mother, Katherine Esther Jackson (née Scruse), played clarinet and piano, had aspired to be a country-and-western performer, and worked part-time at Sears. She was a Jehovah's Witness. His father, Joseph Walter "Joe" Jackson, a former boxer, was a crane operator at U.S. Steel and played guitar with a local rhythm and blues band, the Falcons, to supplement the family's income. Joe's great-grandfather, July "Jack" Gale, was a US Army scout; family lore held that he was also a Native American medicine man. Michael grew up with three sisters (Rebbie, La Toya, and Janet) and five brothers (Jackie, Tito, Jermaine, Marlon, and Randy). A sixth brother, Marlon's twin Brandon, died shortly after birth.

In 1964, Michael and Marlon joined the Jackson Brothers—a band formed by their father which included Jackie, Tito, and Jermaine—as backup musicians playing congas and tambourine. Michael said his father told him he had a "fat nose", and physically and emotionally abused him during rehearsals. He recalled that Joe often sat in a chair with a belt in his hand as he and his siblings rehearsed, ready to punish any mistakes. Joe acknowledged that he regularly whipped Michael. Katherine said that although whipping came to be considered abuse, it was a common way to discipline children when Michael was growing up. Jackie, Tito, Jermaine and Marlon denied that their father was abusive and said that the whippings, which had a deeper impact on Michael because he was younger, kept them disciplined and out of trouble. Michael said that during his youth he was lonely and isolated.

Later in 1965, Michael began sharing lead vocals with Jermaine, and the group's name was changed to the Jackson 5. In 1965, the group won a talent show; Michael performed the dance to Robert Parker's 1965 song "Barefootin'" and sang the Temptations' "My Girl". From 1966 to 1968, the Jacksons 5 toured the Midwest; they frequently played at a string of black clubs known as the Chitlin' Circuit as the opening act for artists such as Sam & Dave, the O'Jays, Gladys Knight, and Etta James. The Jackson 5 also performed at clubs and cocktail lounges, where striptease shows were featured, and at local auditoriums and high school dances. In August 1967, while touring the East Coast, they won a weekly amateur night concert at the Apollo Theater in Harlem.

The Jackson 5 recorded several songs for a Gary record label, Steeltown Records; their first single, "Big Boy", was released in 1968. Bobby Taylor of Bobby Taylor & the Vancouvers brought the Jackson 5 to Motown after they opened for Taylor at Chicago's Regal Theater in 1968. Taylor produced some of their early Motown recordings, including a version of "Who's Lovin' You". After signing with Motown, the Jackson family relocated to Los Angeles. In 1969, Motown executives decided Diana Ross should introduce the Jackson 5 to the public—partly to bolster her career in television—sending off what was considered Motown's last product of its "production line". The Jackson 5 made their first television appearance in 1969 in the Miss Black America pageant, performing a cover of "It's Your Thing". Rolling Stone later described the young Michael as "a prodigy" with "overwhelming musical gifts" who "quickly emerged as the main draw and lead singer".

In January 1970, "I Want You Back" became the first Jackson 5 song to reach number one on the US Billboard Hot 100; it stayed there for four weeks. Three more singles with Motown topped the chart: "ABC", "The Love You Save", and "I'll Be There". In May 1971, the Jackson family moved into a large house at Hayvenhurst, a two-acre estate in Encino, California. During this period, Michael developed from a child performer into a teen idol. Between 1972 and 1975, he released four solo studio albums with Motown: Got to Be There (1972), Ben (1972), Music & Me (1973), and Forever, Michael (1975). "Got to Be There" and "Ben", the title tracks from his first two solo albums, sold well as singles, as did a cover of Bobby Day's "Rockin' Robin".

Michael maintained ties to the Jackson 5. The Jackson 5 were later described as "a cutting-edge example of black crossover artists". They were frustrated by Motown's refusal to allow them creative input. Jackson's performance of their top five single "Dancing Machine" on Soul Train popularized the robot dance.

Move to Epic and Off the Wall (1975–1981)

The Jackson 5 left Motown in 1975, signing with Epic Records and renaming themselves the Jacksons. Their younger brother Randy joined the band around this time; Jermaine stayed with Motown and pursued a solo career. The Jacksons continued to tour internationally, and released six more albums between 1976 and 1984. Michael, the group's main songwriter during this time, wrote songs such as "Shake Your Body (Down to the Ground)" (1978), "This Place Hotel" (1980), and "Can You Feel It" (1980).

In 1977, Jackson moved to New York City to star as the Scarecrow in The Wiz, a musical film directed by Sidney Lumet, alongside Diana Ross, Nipsey Russell, and Ted Ross. The film was a box-office failure. Its score was arranged by Quincy Jones, who later produced three of Jackson's solo albums. During his time in New York, Jackson frequented the Studio 54 nightclub, where he heard early hip hop; this influenced his beatboxing on future tracks such as "Working Day and Night". In 1978, Jackson broke his nose during a dance routine. A rhinoplasty led to breathing difficulties that later affected his career. He was referred to Steven Hoefflin, who performed Jackson's operations.

Jackson's fifth solo album, Off the Wall (1979), established him as a solo performer and helped him move from the bubblegum pop of his youth to more complex sounds. It produced four top 10 entries in the US: "Off the Wall", "She's Out of My Life", and the chart-topping singles "Don't Stop 'Til You Get Enough" and "Rock with You". The album reached number three on the US Billboard 200 and sold over 20million copies worldwide. In 1980, Jackson won three American Music Awards for his solo work: Favorite Soul/R&B Album, Favorite Soul/R&B Male Artist, and Favorite Soul/R&B Single for "Don't Stop 'Til You Get Enough". He also won a Grammy Award for Best Male R&B Vocal Performance for 1979 with "Don't Stop 'Til You Get Enough". In 1981, Jackson was the American Music Awards winner for Favorite Soul/R&B Album and Favorite Soul/R&B Male Artist. Jackson felt Off the Wall should have made a bigger impact, and was determined to exceed expectations with his next release. In 1980, he secured the highest royalty rate in the music industry: 37 percent of wholesale album profit.

Thriller and Motown 25: Yesterday, Today, Forever (1982–1983)

Jackson recorded with Queen singer Freddie Mercury from 1981 to 1983, recording demos of "State of Shock", "Victory" and "There Must Be More to Life Than This". The recordings were intended for an album of duets but, according to Queen's manager Jim Beach, the relationship soured when Jackson brought a llama into the recording studio, and Jackson was upset by Mercury's drug use. "There Must Be More to Life Than This" was released in 2014. Jackson went on to record "State of Shock" with Mick Jagger for the Jacksons' album Victory (1984).

In 1982, Jackson contributed "Someone in the Dark" to the audiobook for the film E.T. the Extra-Terrestrial. Jackson's sixth album, Thriller, was released in late 1982. It was the best-selling album worldwide in 1983, and became the best-selling album of all time in the US and the best-selling album of all time worldwide, selling an estimated  copies. It topped the Billboard 200 chart for 37 weeks and was in the top 10 of the 200 for 80 consecutive weeks. It was the first album to produce seven Billboard Hot 100 top-10 singles, including "Billie Jean", "Beat It", and "Wanna Be Startin' Somethin'".

On March 25, 1983, Jackson reunited with his brothers for Motown 25: Yesterday, Today, Forever, an NBC television special. Jackson's solo performance of "Billie Jean" earned him his first Emmy Award nomination. Wearing a glove decorated with rhinestones, he debuted his moonwalk dance, which Jeffrey Daniel had taught him three years earlier, and it became his signature dance in his repertoire. Jackson had originally turned down the invitation to the show, believing he had been doing too much television. But at the request of Motown founder Berry Gordy, he performed in exchange for an opportunity to do a solo performance. Rolling Stone reporter Mikal Gilmore called the performance "extraordinary". Jackson's performance drew comparisons to Elvis Presley's and the Beatles' appearances on The Ed Sullivan Show. Anna Kisselgoff of The New York Times praised the perfect timing and technique involved in the dance. Gordy described being "mesmerized" by the performance.

At the 26th Annual Grammy Awards, Thriller won eight awards, and Jackson won an award for the E.T. the Extra-Terrestrial storybook. Winning eight Grammys in one ceremony is a record he holds with the band Santana. Jackson and Quincy Jones won the award for Producer of the Year (Non-Classical). Thriller won Album of the Year (with Jackson as the album's artist and Jones as its co-producer), and the single won Best Pop Vocal Performance (Male) award for Jackson. "Beat It" won Record of the Year and Best Rock Vocal Performance (Male). "Billie Jean" won two Grammy awards: Best R&B Song and Best R&B Vocal Performance (Male), with Jackson as songwriter and singer respectively.

Thriller won the Grammy for Best Engineered Recording (Non Classical), acknowledging Bruce Swedien for his work on the album. At the 11th Annual American Music Awards, Jackson won another eight awards and became the youngest artist to win the Award of Merit. He also won Favorite Male Artist, Favorite Soul/R&B Artist, and Favorite Pop/Rock Artist. "Beat It" won Favorite Soul/R&B Video, Favorite Pop/Rock Video and Favorite Pop/Rock Single. The album won Favorite Soul/R&B Album and Favorite Pop/Rock Album. Thrillers sales doubled after the release of an extended music video, Michael Jackson's Thriller, which sees Jackson dancing with a horde of zombies.

The success transformed Jackson into a dominant force in global pop culture. Jackson had the highest royalty rate in the music industry at that point, with about $2 for every album sold, and was making record-breaking profits. Dolls modeled after Jackson appeared in stores in May 1984 for $12 each. In the same year, The Making of Michael Jackson's Thriller, a documentary about the music video, won a Grammy for Best Music Video (Longform). Time described Jackson's influence at that point as "star of records, radio, rock video. A one-man rescue team for the music business. A songwriter who sets the beat for a decade. A dancer with the fanciest feet on the street. A singer who cuts across all boundaries of taste and style and color too." The New York Times wrote "in the world of pop music, there is Michael Jackson and there is everybody else".

On May 14, 1984, President Ronald Reagan gave Jackson an award recognizing his support of alcohol and drug abuse charities, and in recognition of his support for the Ad Council's and the National Highway Traffic Safety Administration's Drunk Driving Prevention campaign. Jackson allowed the campaign to use "Beat It" for its public service announcements.

Pepsi incident and other commercial activities (1984–1985)

In November 1983, Jackson and his brothers partnered with PepsiCo in a $5million promotional deal that broke records for a celebrity endorsement. The first Pepsi campaign, which ran in the US from 1983 to 1984 and launched its "New Generation" theme, included tour sponsorship, public relations events, and in-store displays. Jackson helped to create the advertisement, and suggested using his song "Billie Jean", with revised lyrics, as its jingle.

On January 27, 1984, Michael and other members of the Jacksons filmed a Pepsi commercial overseen by Phil Dusenberry, a BBDO ad agency executive, and Alan Pottasch, Pepsi's Worldwide Creative Director, at the Shrine Auditorium in Los Angeles. During a simulated concert before a full house of fans, pyrotechnics accidentally set Jackson's hair on fire, causing second-degree burns to his scalp. Jackson underwent treatment to hide the scars and had his third rhinoplasty shortly thereafter.

Pepsi settled out of court, and Jackson donated the $1.5million settlement to the Brotman Medical Center in Culver City, California; its now-closed Michael Jackson Burn Center was named in his honor. Jackson signed a second agreement with Pepsi in the late 1980s for $10million. The second campaign covered 20 countries and provided financial support for Jackson's Bad album and 1987–88 world tour. Jackson had endorsements and advertising deals with other companies, such as LA Gear, Suzuki, and Sony, but none were as significant as his deals with Pepsi.

The Victory Tour of 1984 headlined the Jacksons and showcased Jackson's new solo material to more than two million Americans. It was the last tour he did with his brothers. Following controversy over the concert's ticket sales, Jackson donated his share of the proceeds, an estimated , to charity. During the last concert of the Victory Tour at the Dodger Stadium in Los Angeles, Jackson announced his split from the Jacksons during "Shake Your Body".

His charitable work continued with the release of "We Are the World" (1985), co-written with Lionel Richie, which raised money for the poor in the US and Africa.  It earned $63million, and became one of the best-selling singles of all time, with 20million copies sold. It won four Grammy Awards in 1985, including Song of the Year for Jackson and Richie as its writers. The project's creators received two special American Music Awards honors: one for the creation of the song and another for the USA for Africa idea. Jackson, Jones, and promoter Ken Kragen received special awards for their roles in the song's creation.

Jackson collaborated with Paul McCartney in the early 1980s, and learned that McCartney was making $40million a year from owning the rights to other artists' songs. By 1983, Jackson had begun buying publishing rights to others' songs, but he was careful with his acquisitions, only bidding on a few of the dozens that were offered to him. Jackson's early acquisitions of music catalogs and song copyrights such as the Sly Stone collection included "Everyday People" (1968), Len Barry's "1–2–3" (1965), and Dion DiMucci's "The Wanderer" (1961) and "Runaround Sue" (1961).

In 1984, Robert Holmes à Court announced he was selling the ATV Music Publishing catalog comprising the publishing rights to nearly 4,000 songs, including most of the Beatles' material. In 1981, McCartney had been offered the catalog for £20million ($40million). Jackson submitted a bid of $46million on November 20, 1984. When Jackson and McCartney were unable to make a joint purchase, McCartney did not want to be the sole owner of the Beatles' songs, and did not pursue an offer on his own. Jackson's agents were unable to come to a deal, and in May 1985 left talks after having spent more than $1million and four months of due diligence work on the negotiations.

In June 1985, Jackson and Branca learned that Charles Koppelman's and Marty Bandier's The Entertainment Company had made a tentative offer to buy ATV Music for $50million; in early August, Holmes à Court contacted Jackson and talks resumed. Jackson's increased bid of $47.5million was accepted because he could close the deal more quickly, having already completed due diligence. Jackson agreed to visit Holmes à Court in Australia, where he would appear on the Channel Seven Perth Telethon. His purchase of ATV Music was finalized on August 10, 1985.

Increased tabloid speculation (1986–1987)

Jackson's skin had been medium-brown during his youth, but from the mid-1980s gradually grew paler. The change drew widespread media coverage, including speculation that he had been bleaching his skin. His dermatologist, Arnold Klein, said he observed in 1983 that Jackson had vitiligo, a condition characterized by patches of the skin losing their pigment and sensitivity to sunlight. He also identified discoid lupus erythematosus in Jackson. He diagnosed Jackson with lupus that year, and with vitiligo in 1986. Vitiligo's drastic effects on the body can cause psychological distress. Jackson used fair-colored makeup, and possibly skin-bleaching prescription creams, to cover up the uneven blotches of color caused by the illness. The creams would depigment the blotches, and, with the application of makeup, he could appear very pale. Jackson said he had not purposely bleached his skin and could not control his vitiligo, adding, "When people make up stories that I don't want to be who I am, it hurts me." He became friends with Klein and Klein's assistant, Debbie Rowe. Rowe later became Jackson's second wife and the mother of his first two children.

In his 1988 autobiography and a 1993 interview, Jackson said he had had two rhinoplasty surgeries and a cleft chin surgery but no more than that. He said he lost weight in the early 1980s because of a change in diet to achieve a dancer's body. Witnesses reported that he was often dizzy, and speculated he was suffering from anorexia nervosa. Periods of weight loss became a recurring problem later in his life. After his death, Jackson's mother said that he first turned to cosmetic procedures to remedy his vitiligo, because he did not want to look like a "spotted cow". She said he had received more than the two cosmetic surgeries he claimed and speculated that he had become addicted to them.

In 1986, tabloids reported that Jackson slept in a hyperbaric oxygen chamber to slow aging, and pictured him lying in a glass box. The claim was untrue, and tabloids reported that he spread the story himself. They also reported that Jackson took female hormone shots to keep his voice high and facial hair wispy, proposed to Elizabeth Taylor and possibly had a shrine of her, and had cosmetic surgery on his eyes. Jackson's manager Frank DiLeo denied all of them, except for Jackson having a chamber. DiLeo added "I don't know if he sleeps in it. I'm not for it. But Michael thinks it's something that's probably healthy for him. He's a bit of a health fanatic."

When Jackson took his pet chimpanzee Bubbles to tour in Japan, the media portrayed Jackson as an aspiring Disney cartoon character who befriended animals. It was also reported that Jackson had offered to buy the bones of Joseph Merrick (the "Elephant Man"). In June 1987, the Chicago Tribune reported Jackson's publicist bidding $1million for the skeleton to the London Hospital Medical College on his behalf. The college maintained the skeleton was not for sale. DiLeo said Jackson had an "absorbing interest" in Merrick, "purely based on his awareness of the ethical, medical and historical significance."

In September 1986, using the false hyperbaric chamber story, the British tabloid The Sun branded Jackson "Wacko Jacko", a name Jackson came to despise. The Atlantic noted that the name "Jacko" has racist connotations, as it originates from Jacko Macacco, a monkey used in  monkey-baiting matches at the Westminster Pit in the early 1820s, and "Jacko" was used in Cockney slang to refer to monkeys in general.

Jackson worked with George Lucas and Francis Ford Coppola on the 17-minute $30million 3D film Captain EO, which ran from 1986 at Disneyland and Epcot, and later at Tokyo Disneyland and Euro Disneyland. After having been removed in the late 1990s, it returned to the theme park for several years after Jackson's death. In 1987, Jackson disassociated himself from the Jehovah's Witnesses. Katherine Jackson said this might have been because some Witnesses strongly opposed the Thriller video. Michael had denounced it in a Witness publication in 1984.

Bad, autobiography, and Neverland (1987–1990)

Jackson's first album in five years, Bad (1987), was highly anticipated, with the industry expecting another major success. It became the first album to produce five US number-one singles: "I Just Can't Stop Loving You", "Bad", "The Way You Make Me Feel", "Man in the Mirror", and "Dirty Diana". Another song, "Smooth Criminal", peaked at number seven. Bad won the 1988 Grammy for Best Engineered Recording – Non Classical and the 1990 Grammy Award for Best Music Video, Short Form for "Leave Me Alone". Jackson won an Award of Achievement at the American Music Awards in 1989 after Bad generated five number-one singles, became the first album to top the charts in 25 countries and the best-selling album worldwide in 1987 and 1988. By 2012, it had sold between 30 and 45million copies worldwide.

The Bad world tour ran from September 12, 1987, to January 14, 1989. In Japan, the tour had 14 sellouts and drew 570,000 people, nearly tripling the previous record for a single tour. The 504,000 people who attended seven sold-out shows at Wembley Stadium set a new Guinness World Record.

In 1988, Jackson released his autobiography, Moonwalk, with input from Stephen Davis and Jacqueline Kennedy Onassis. It sold 200,000 copies, and reached the top of the New York Times bestsellers list. Jackson discussed his childhood, the Jackson 5, and the abuse from his father. He attributed his changing facial appearance to three plastic surgeries, puberty, weight loss, a strict vegetarian diet, a change in hairstyle, and stage lighting. In June, Jackson was honoured with the Grand Vermeil Medal of the City of Paris by the then Mayor of Paris Jacques Chirac during his stay in the city as part of the Bad world tour. In October, Jackson released a film, Moonwalker, which featured live footage and short films starring Jackson and Joe Pesci. In the US it was released direct-to-video and became the best-selling video cassette in the country. The Recording Industry Association of America (RIAA) certified it as eight times Platinum in the US.

In March 1988, Jackson purchased  of land near Santa Ynez, California, to build a new home, Neverland Ranch, at a cost of $17million. He installed a Ferris wheel, a carousel, a movie theater and a zoo. A security staff of 40 patrolled the grounds. Shortly afterwards, he appeared in the first Western television advertisement in the Soviet Union.

Jackson became known as the "King of Pop", a nickname that Jackson's publicists embraced. When Elizabeth Taylor presented him with the Soul Train Heritage Award in 1989, she called him "the true king of pop, rock and soul." President George H. W. Bush designated him the White House's "Artist of the Decade". From 1985 to 1990, Jackson donated $455,000 to the United Negro College Fund, and all profits from his single "Man in the Mirror" went to charity. His rendition of "You Were There" at Sammy Davis Jr.'s 60th birthday celebration won Jackson a second Emmy nomination. Jackson was the bestselling artist of the 1980s.

Dangerous and public social work (1991–1993)
In March 1991, Jackson renewed his contract with Sony for $65million, a record-breaking deal, beating Neil Diamond's renewal contract with Columbia Records. In 1991, he released his eighth album, Dangerous, co-produced with Teddy Riley. It was certified eight times platinum in the US, and by 2018 had sold 32million copies worldwide. In the US, the first single, "Black or White", was the album's highest-charting song; it was number one on the Billboard Hot 100 for seven weeks and achieved similar chart performances worldwide. The second single, "Remember the Time" peaked at number three on the Billboard Hot 100 singles chart. At the end of 1992, Dangerous was the best-selling album of the year worldwide and "Black or White" the best-selling single of the year worldwide at the Billboard Music Awards. In 1993, he performed "Remember the Time" at the Soul Train Music Awards in a chair, saying he twisted his ankle during dance rehearsals. In the UK, "Heal the World" made No. 2 on the charts in 1992.

Jackson founded the Heal the World Foundation in 1992. The charity brought underprivileged children to Jackson's ranch to use the theme park rides, and sent millions of dollars around the globe to help children threatened by war, poverty, and disease. That July, Jackson published his second book, Dancing the Dream, a collection of poetry. The Dangerous World Tour ran between June 1992 and November 1993 and grossed ; Jackson performed for 3.5million people in 70 concerts, all of which were outside the US. Part of the proceeds went to Heal the World Foundation. Jackson sold the broadcast rights of the tour to HBO for $20million, a record-breaking deal that still stands.

Following the death of HIV/AIDS spokesperson and friend Ryan White, Jackson pleaded with the Clinton administration at Bill Clinton's inaugural gala to give more money to HIV/AIDS charities and research and performed "Gone Too Soon", a song dedicated to White, and "Heal the World" at the gala. Jackson visited Africa in early 1992; on his first stop in Gabon he was greeted by more than 100,000 people, some of them carrying signs that read "Welcome Home Michael", and was awarded an Officer of the National Order of Merit from President Omar Bongo. During his trip to Ivory Coast, Jackson was crowned "King Sani" by a tribal chief. He thanked the dignitaries in French and English, signed documents formalizing his kingship, and sat on a golden throne while presiding over ceremonial dances.

In January 1993, Jackson performed at the Super Bowl XXVII halftime show in Pasadena, California. The NFL sought a big-name artist to keep ratings high during halftime following dwindling audience figures. It was the first Super Bowl whose half-time performance drew greater audience figures than the game. Jackson played "Jam", "Billie Jean", "Black or White", and "Heal the World". Dangerous rose 90 places in the US albums chart after the performance.

Jackson gave a 90-minute interview with Oprah Winfrey on February 10, 1993. He spoke of his childhood abuse at the hands of his father; he believed he had missed out on much of his childhood, and said that he often cried from loneliness. He denied tabloid rumors that he had bought the bones of the Elephant Man, slept in a hyperbaric oxygen chamber, or bleached his skin, and stated for the first time that he had vitiligo. After the interview, Dangerous re-entered the US albums chart in the top 10, more than a year after its release.

In January 1993, Jackson won three American Music Awards: Favorite Pop/Rock Album (Dangerous), Favorite Soul/R&B Single ("Remember the Time"), and was the first to win the International Artist Award of Excellence. In February, he won the "Living Legend Award" at the 35th Annual Grammy Awards in Los Angeles. He attended the award ceremony with Brooke Shields. Dangerous was nominated for Best Vocal Performance (for "Black or White"), Best R&B Vocal Performance ("Jam") and Best R&B Song ("Jam"), and Bruce Swedien and Teddy Riley won the Grammy for Best Engineered – Non Classical.

First child sexual abuse accusations and first marriage (1993–1995)

In August 1993, Jackson was accused of child sexual abuse by a 13-year-old boy, Jordan Chandler, and his father, Evan Chandler. Jordan said he and Jackson had engaged in acts of kissing, masturbation and oral sex. While Jordan's mother initially told police that she did not believe Jackson had molested him, her position wavered a few days later. Evan was recorded discussing his intention to pursue charges, which Jackson used to argue that he was the victim of a jealous father trying to extort money. Jackson's older sister La Toya accused him of being a pedophile; she later retracted this, saying she had been forced into it by her abusive husband.

Police raided Jackson's home in August and found two legal large-format art books featuring young boys playing, running and swimming in various states of undress. Jackson denied knowing of the books' content and claimed if they were there someone had to send them to him and he did not open them. Jordan Chandler gave police a description of Jackson's genitals. A strip search was made, and the jurors felt the description was not a match. In January 1994, Jackson settled with the Chandlers out of court for a reported total sum of $23 million. The police never pressed criminal charges. Citing a lack of evidence without Jordan's testimony, the state closed its investigation on September 22, 1994.

Jackson had been taking painkillers for his reconstructive scalp surgeries, administered due to the Pepsi commercial accident in 1984, and became dependent on them to cope with the stress of the sexual abuse allegations. On November 12, 1993, Jackson canceled the remainder of the Dangerous Tour due to health problems, stress from the allegations and painkiller addiction. He thanked close friend Elizabeth Taylor for support, encouragement and counsel. The end of the tour concluded his relationship with Pepsi Cola, which sponsored the tour.

In late 1993, Jackson proposed to Lisa Marie Presley, the daughter of Elvis Presley, over the phone. They married in La Vega, Dominican Republic, in May 1994 by civil judge Hugo Francisco Álvarez Pérez. The tabloid media speculated that the wedding was a publicity stunt to deflect away from Jackson's sexual abuse allegations and jump-start Presley's career as a singer. Their marriage ended little more than a year later, and they separated in December 1995. Presley cited "irreconcilable differences" when filing for divorce the next month and only sought to reclaim her maiden name as her settlement. After the divorce, Judge Pérez said, "They lasted longer than I thought they would. I gave them a year. They lasted a year and a half." Presley later said she and Jackson had attempted to reconcile intermittently for four years following their divorce, and that she had travelled the world to be with him.

Jackson composed music for the Sega Genesis video game Sonic the Hedgehog 3 (1994), but left the project around the time the sexual abuse allegations surfaced and went uncredited. The Sega Technical Institute director Roger Hector and the Sonic co-creator Naoto Ohshima said that Jackson's involvement was terminated and his music reworked following the allegations. However, Jackson's musical director Brad Buxer and other members of Jackson's team said Jackson went uncredited because he was unhappy with how the Genesis replicated his music.

HIStory, second marriage, and fatherhood (1995–1997)

In June 1995, Jackson released the double album HIStory: Past, Present and Future, Book I. The first disc, HIStory Begins, is a greatest hits album (reissued in 2001 as Greatest Hits: HIStory, Volume I). The second disc, HIStory Continues, contains 13 original songs and two cover versions. The album debuted at number one on the charts and has been certified for eight million shipments in the US. It is the best-selling multi-disc album of all time, with 20million copies (40million units) sold worldwide. HIStory received a Grammy nomination for Album of the Year. The New York Times reviewed it as "the testimony of a musician whose self-pity now equals his talent".

The first single from HIStory was "Scream/Childhood". "Scream", a duet with Jackson's youngest sister Janet, protests the media's treatment of Jackson during the 1993 child abuse allegations against him. The single reached number five on the Billboard Hot 100, and received a Grammy nomination for "Best Pop Collaboration with Vocals". The second single, "You Are Not Alone", holds the Guinness world record for the first song to debut at number one on the Billboard Hot 100 chart. It received a Grammy nomination for "Best Pop Vocal Performance" in 1995.

In 1995 the Anti-Defamation League and other groups complained that "Jew me, sue me, everybody do me/ Kick me, kike me, don't you black or white me", the original lyrics of "They Don't Care About Us", were antisemitic. Jackson released a version with revised words.

In late 1995, Jackson was admitted to a hospital after collapsing during rehearsals for a televised performance, caused by a stress-related panic attack. In November, Jackson merged his ATV Music catalog with Sony's music publishing division, creating Sony/ATV Music Publishing. He retained ownership of half the company, earning $95million up front as well as the rights to more songs.

"Earth Song" was the third single released from HIStory, and topped the UK Singles Chart for six weeks over Christmas 1995. It became the 87th-bestselling single in the UK. At the 1996 Brit Awards, Jackson's performance of "Earth Song" was disrupted by Pulp singer Jarvis Cocker, who was protesting what Cocker saw as Jackson's "Christ-like" persona. Jackson said the stage invasion was "disgusting and cowardly".

In 1996, Jackson won a Grammy for Best Music Video, Short Form, for "Scream" and an American Music Award for Favorite Pop/Rock Male Artist. On July 1996, Jackson performed for Sultan Hassanal Bolkiah's fiftieth birthday at Jerudong Park Amphitheater, which was specifically built for that birthday concert. Jackson was reportedly paid $17M ($32 million in 2023 dollars). Jackson promoted HIStory with the HIStory World Tour, from September 7, 1996, to October 15, 1997. He performed 82 concerts in five continents, 35 countries and 58 cities to over 4.5million fans, his most attended tour. It grossed . During the tour, in Sydney, Australia, Jackson married Debbie Rowe, a dermatology assistant, who was six months pregnant with his first child.

Michael Joseph Jackson Jr. (commonly known as Prince) was born on February 13, 1997. His sister Paris-Michael Katherine Jackson was born on April 3, 1998. Jackson and Rowe divorced in 2000, Rowe conceded custody of the children, with an $8million settlement. In 2004, after the second child abuse allegations against Jackson, she returned to court to reclaim custody. The suit was settled in 2006.

In 1997, Jackson released Blood on the Dance Floor: HIStory in the Mix, which contained remixes of singles from HIStory and five new songs. Worldwide sales stand at  copies, making it the best-selling remix album. It reached number one in the UK, as did the single "Blood on the Dance Floor". In the US, the album reached number 24 and was certified platinum.

Label dispute and Invincible (1997–2002)
From October 1997 to September 2001, Jackson worked on his tenth solo album, Invincible, which cost  to record. In June 1999, Jackson joined Luciano Pavarotti for a War Child benefit concert in Modena, Italy. The show raised a million dollars for refugees of the Kosovo War, and additional funds for the children of Guatemala. Later that month, Jackson organized a series of "Michael Jackson & Friends" benefit concerts in Germany and Korea. Other artists involved included Slash, The Scorpions, Boyz II Men, Luther Vandross, Mariah Carey, A. R. Rahman, Prabhu Deva Sundaram, Shobana, Andrea Bocelli, and Luciano Pavarotti. The proceeds went to the Nelson Mandela Children's Fund, the Red Cross and UNESCO. In 1999, Jackson was presented with the "Outstanding Humanitarian Award" at Bollywood Movie Awards in New York City where he noted Mahatma Gandhi to have been an inspiration for him. From August 1999 to 2000, he lived in New York City at 4 East 74th Street. At the turn of the century, Jackson won an American Music Award as Artist of the 1980s. In 2000, Guinness World Records recognized him for supporting 39 charities, more than any other entertainer.

In September 2001, two 30th Anniversary concerts were held at Madison Square Garden to mark Jackson's 30th year as a solo artist. Jackson performed with his brothers for the first time since 1984. The show also featured Mýa, Usher, Whitney Houston, Destiny's Child, Monica, Liza Minnelli, and Slash. The first show was marred by technical lapses, and the crowd booed a speech by Marlon Brando. Almost 30million people watched the television broadcast of the shows in November. After the September 11 attacks, Jackson helped organize the United We Stand: What More Can I Give benefit concert at RFK Stadium in Washington, D.C. on October 21, 2001. Jackson performed "What More Can I Give" as the finale.

The release of Invincible was preceded by a dispute between Jackson and his record label, Sony Music Entertainment. Jackson had expected the licenses to the masters of his albums to revert to him in the early 2000s, after which he would be able to promote the material however he pleased and keep the profits, but clauses in the contract set the revert date years into the future. Jackson sought an early exit from his contract. Invincible was released on October 30, 2001. It was Jackson's first full-length album in six years, and the last album of original material he released in his lifetime. It debuted at number one in 13 countries and went on to sell eightmillion copies worldwide, receiving double-platinum certification in the US.

On January 9, 2002, Jackson won his 22nd American Music Award for Artist of the Century. Later that year, an anonymous surrogate mother gave birth to his third child, Prince Michael Jackson II (nicknamed "Blanket"), who had been conceived by artificial insemination. On November 20, Jackson briefly held Blanket over the railing of his Berlin hotel room, four stories above ground level, prompting widespread criticism in the media. Jackson apologized for the incident, calling it "a terrible mistake". On January 22, promoter Marcel Avram filed a breach of contract complaint against Jackson for failing to perform two planned 1999 concerts. In March, a Santa Maria jury ordered Jackson to pay Avram $5.3million. On December 18, 2003, Jackson's attorneys dropped all appeals on the verdict and settled the lawsuit for an undisclosed amount.

On April 24, 2002, Jackson performed at Apollo Theater. The concert was a fundraiser for the Democratic National Committee and former President Bill Clinton. The money collected would be used to encourage citizens to vote. It raised $2.5million. The concert was called Michael Jackson: Live at the Apollo and was one of Jackson's final on-stage performances.

In July 2002, Jackson called Sony Music chairman Tommy Mottola "a racist, and very, very, very devilish," and someone who exploits black artists for his own gain, at Al Sharpton's National Action Network in Harlem. The accusation prompted Sharpton to form a coalition investigating whether Mottola exploited black artists. Jackson charged that Mottola had called his colleague Irv Gotti a "fat nigger". Responding to those attacks, Sony issued a statement calling them "ludicrous, spiteful, and hurtful" and defended Mottola as someone who had championed Jackson's career for many years. Sony ultimately refused to renew Jackson's contract and claimed that a  promotional campaign had failed because Jackson refused to tour in the US for Invincible.

Second child abuse allegations and acquittal (2002–2005)

Beginning in May 2002, a documentary film crew led by Martin Bashir followed Jackson for several months. The documentary, broadcast in February 2003 as Living with Michael Jackson, showed Jackson holding hands and discussing sleeping arrangements with a 12-year-old boy. He said that he saw nothing wrong with having sleepovers with minors and sharing his bed and bedroom with various people, which aroused controversy. He insisted that the sleepovers were not sexual and that his words had been misunderstood.

In October 2003, Jackson received the Key to the City of Las Vegas from Mayor Oscar Goodman. On November 18, 2003, Sony released Number Ones, a greatest hits compilation. It was certified five times platinum by the RIAA, and nine times platinum in the UK, for shipments of at least 2.7million units.

On December 18, 2003, Santa Barbara authorities charged Jackson with seven counts of child molestation and two counts of intoxicating a minor with alcoholic drinks. Jackson denied the allegations and pleaded not guilty. The People v. Jackson trial began on January 31, 2005, in Santa Maria, California, and lasted until the end of May. Jackson found the experience stressful and it affected his health. If convicted, he would have faced up to 20 years in prison. On June 13, 2005, Jackson was acquitted on all counts. FBI files on Jackson, released in 2009, revealed the FBI's role in the 2005 trial and the 1993 allegations, and showed that the FBI found no evidence of criminal conduct on Jackson's behalf.

Final years, financial problems and This Is It (2005–2009)

After the trial, Jackson became reclusive. In June 2005, he moved to Bahrain as a guest of Sheikh Abdullah. In early 2006, it was announced that Jackson had signed a contract with a Bahrain startup, Two Seas Records. Nothing came of the deal, and the Two Seas CEO, Guy Holmes, later said it was never finalized. Holmes also found that Jackson was on the verge of bankruptcy and was involved in 47 ongoing lawsuits. By September 2006, Jackson was  no longer affiliated with Two Seas.

In April 2006, Jackson agreed to use a piece of his ATV catalog stake, then worth about $1billion, as collateral against his $270million worth of loans from Bank of America. Bank of America had sold the loans to Fortress Investments, an investment company that buys distressed loans, the year before. As part of the agreement, Fortress Investments provided Jackson a new loan of $300million with reduced interest payments. Sony Music would have the option to buy half of his stake, or about 25% of the catalog, at a set price. Jackson's financial managers had urged him to shed part of his stake to avoid bankruptcy. The main house at Neverland Ranch was closed as a cost-cutting measure, while Jackson lived in Bahrain at the hospitality of Abdullah. At least 30 of Jackson's employees had not been paid on time and were owed $306,000 in back wages. Jackson was ordered to pay $100,000 in penalties.

In mid-2006, Jackson moved to Grouse Lodge, a residential recording studio near Rosemount, County Westmeath, Ireland, where he began work on a new album with the American producers will.i.am and Rodney Jenkins. That November, Jackson invited an Access Hollywood camera crew into the studio in Westmeath. On November 15, Jackson briefly performed "We Are the World" at the World Music Awards in London, his last public performance, and accepted the Diamond Award for sales of  records. He returned to the US in December, settling in Las Vegas. He attended James Brown's funeral in Augusta, Georgia, that month, where he gave a eulogy calling Brown his greatest inspiration.

In 2007, Jackson and Sony bought another music publishing company, Famous Music LLC, formerly owned by Viacom. The deal gave Jackson the rights to songs by Eminem and Beck, among others. In a brief interview, Jackson said he had no regrets about his career despite his problems and "deliberate attempts to hurt [him]". That March, Jackson visited a US Army post in Japan, Camp Zama, to greet more than 3,000 troops and their families.

In September 2007, Jackson was still working on his next album, which he never completed. For the 25th anniversary of Thriller in 2008, Jackson and Sony released Thriller 25, with two remixes released as singles: "The Girl Is Mine 2008" and "Wanna Be Startin' Somethin' 2008". For Jackson's 50th birthday, Sony BMG released a series of greatest hits albums, King of Pop, with different tracklists for different regions.

In 2008, Fortress Investments threatened to foreclose on Neverland Ranch, which Jackson had used as collateral for his loans. Fortress sold Jackson's debts to Colony Capital LLC. In November, Jackson transferred Neverland Ranch's title to Sycamore Valley Ranch Company LLC, a joint venture between Jackson and Colony Capital LLC. The deal earned him . In 2009, Jackson arranged to sell a collection of his memorabilia of more than 1,000 items through Julien's Auction House, but canceled the auction in April.

In March 2009, amid speculation about his finances and health, Jackson announced a series of comeback concerts, This Is It, at a press conference at the O2 Arena. The shows were to be his first major concerts since the HIStory World Tour in 1997. Jackson suggested he would retire after the shows. The initial plan was for 10 concerts in London, followed by shows in Paris, New York City and Mumbai. Randy Phillips, the president and chief executive of AEG Live, predicted the first 10 dates would earn Jackson £50million.

The London residency was increased to 50 dates after record-breaking ticket sales; more than one million were sold in less than two hours. The concerts were to run from July 13, 2009, to March 6, 2010. Jackson moved to Los Angeles, where he rehearsed in the weeks leading up to the tour under the direction of the choreographer Kenny Ortega, whom he had worked with during his previous tours. Rehearsals took place at the Forum and the Staples Center owned by AEG. By this point, Jackson's debt had grown to almost $500 million. By the time of his death, he was three or four months behind payments of his home in San Fernando Valley. The Independent reported that Jackson planned a string of further ventures designed to recoup his debts, including a world tour, a new album, films, a museum and a casino.

Death

On June 25, 2009, less than three weeks before his concert residency was due to begin in London, with all concerts sold out, Jackson died from cardiac arrest, caused by a propofol and benzodiazepine overdose. Conrad Murray, his personal physician, had given Jackson various medications to help him sleep at his rented mansion in Holmby Hills, Los Angeles. Paramedics received a 911 call at 12:22 pm Pacific time (19:22 UTC) and arrived three minutes later. Jackson was not breathing and CPR was performed. Resuscitation efforts continued en route to Ronald Reagan UCLA Medical Center, and for more than an hour after Jackson's arrival there, but were unsuccessful, and Jackson was pronounced dead at 2:26 pm Pacific time (21:26 UTC).

Jackson was administered propofol, lorazepam, and midazolam; his death was caused by a propofol overdose. News of his death spread quickly online, causing websites to slow down and crash from user overload, and putting unprecedented strain on services and websites including Google, AOL Instant Messenger, Twitter, and Wikipedia. Overall, web traffic rose by between 11% and 20%. MTV and BET aired marathons of Jackson's music videos, and Jackson specials aired on television stations around the world. MTV briefly returned to its original music video format, and aired hours of Jackson's music videos, with live news specials featuring reactions from MTV personalities and other celebrities.

Memorial service

Jackson's memorial was held on July 7, 2009, at the Staples Center in Los Angeles, preceded by a private family service at Forest Lawn Memorial Park's Hall of Liberty. Over 1.6million fans applied for tickets to the memorial; the 8,750 recipients were drawn at random, and each received two tickets. The memorial service was one of the most watched events in streaming history, with an estimated US audience of 31.1million and a worldwide audience of an estimated 2.5 to 3 billion.

Mariah Carey, Stevie Wonder, Lionel Richie, Jennifer Hudson, and Shaheen Jafargholi performed at the memorial, and Smokey Robinson and Queen Latifah gave eulogies. Al Sharpton received a standing ovation with cheers when he told Jackson's children: "Wasn't nothing strange about your daddy. It was strange what your daddy had to deal with. But he dealt with it anyway." Jackson's 11-year-old daughter Paris Katherine, speaking publicly for the first time, wept as she addressed the crowd. The Rev. Lucious Smith provided a closing prayer. On September 3, 2009, the body of Jackson was entombed at Forest Lawn Memorial Park in Glendale, California.

Criminal investigation and prosecution of Conrad Murray

In August 2009, the Los Angeles County Coroner ruled that Jackson's death was a homicide. Law enforcement officials charged Murray with involuntary manslaughter on February 8, 2010. In late 2011, he was found guilty of involuntary manslaughter and held without bail to await sentencing. Murray was sentenced to four years in prison.

Posthumous sales
At the 2009 American Music Awards, Jackson won four posthumous awards, including two for his compilation album Number Ones, bringing his total American Music Awards to 26. In the year after his death, more than 16.1million copies of Jackson's albums sold in the US alone, and 35million copies were sold worldwide, more than any other artist in 2009. He became the first artist to sell one million music downloads in a week, with 2.6million song downloads. Thriller, Number Ones, and The Essential Michael Jackson became the first catalog albums to outsell any new album. Jackson also became the first artist to have four of the top-20 best-selling albums in a single year in the US.

Following the surge in sales, in March 2010, Sony Music signed a $250million deal with the Jackson estate to extend their distribution rights to Jackson's back catalog until at least 2017; it had been due to expire in 2015. It was the most expensive music contract for a single artist in history. They agreed to release ten albums of previously unreleased material and new collections of released work. The deal was extended in 2017. That July, a Los Angeles court awarded Quincy Jones $9.4million of disputed royalty payments for Off the Wall, Thriller, and Bad. In July 2018, Sony/ATV bought the estate's stake in EMI for $287.5million.

In 2014, Jackson became the first artist to have a top-ten single in the Billboard Hot 100 in five different decades. The following year, Thriller became the first album to be certified for 30million shipments by the Recording Industry Association of America (RIAA); a year later, it was certified 33× platinum after Soundscan added streams and audio downloads to album certifications.

Posthumous releases and productions
The first posthumous Jackson song, "This Is It", co-written in the 1980s with Paul Anka, was released in October 2009. The surviving Jackson brothers reunited to record backing vocals. It was followed by a documentary film about the rehearsals for the canceled This Is It tour, Michael Jackson's This Is It, and a compilation album. Despite a limited two-week engagement, the film became the highest-grossing documentary or concert film ever, with earnings of more than  worldwide. Jackson's estate received 90% of the profits. In late 2010, Sony released the first posthumous album, Michael, and the promotional single "Breaking News". Jackson collaborator will.i.am expressed disgust, saying that Jackson would not have approved the release.

The Video game developer Ubisoft released a music video game featuring Jackson for the 2010 holiday season, Michael Jackson: The Experience. It was among the first games to use Kinect and PlayStation Move, the motion-detecting camera systems for Xbox 360 and PlayStation 3. In April 2011, Mohamed Al-Fayed, chairman of Fulham Football Club, unveiled a statue of Jackson outside the club stadium, Craven Cottage. It was moved to the National Football Museum in Manchester in May 2014, and removed from display in March 2019 following renewed sexual assault allegations.

In October 2011, the theater company Cirque du Soleil launched Michael Jackson: The Immortal World Tour, a $57-million production, in Montreal, with a permanent show resident in Las Vegas. A larger and more theatrical Cirque show, Michael Jackson: One, designed for residency at the Mandalay Bay resort in Las Vegas, opened on May 23, 2013, in a renovated theater.

In 2012, in an attempt to end a family dispute, Jackson's brother Jermaine retracted his signature on a public letter criticizing executors of Jackson's estate and his mother's advisors over the legitimacy of his brother's will. T.J. Jackson, son of Tito Jackson, was given co-guardianship of Michael Jackson's children after false reports of Katherine Jackson going missing. Xscape, an album of unreleased material, was released on May 13, 2014. A duet between Jackson and Justin Timberlake titled "Love Never Felt So Good" was released in 2014, making Jackson the first artist to have a top 10 single on the US Billboard Hot 100 in five different decades when the single reached number 9.

Later in 2014, Queen released a duet recorded with Jackson and Freddie Mercury in the 1980s. A compilation album, Scream, was released on September 29, 2017. A jukebox musical, MJ the Musical, premiered on Broadway in 2022. Myles Frost won the 2022 Tony Award for Best Actor in a Musical for his portrayal of Jackson. On November 18, 2022, a 40th-anniversary edition reissue of Thriller was released.

A biopic based on Jackson's life, Michael, is due to enter production through Lionsgate in 2023. It will be directed by Antoine Fuqua, produced by Graham King and written by John Logan. Jackson will be played by Jaafar Jackson, a son of Jackson's brother Jermaine. Deadline Hollywood reported that the film "will not shy away from the controversies of Jackson's life".

Posthumous child sexual abuse allegations

In 2013, choreographer Wade Robson filed a lawsuit alleging that Jackson had sexually abused him for seven years, beginning when he was seven years old (1989–1996). In 2014, a case was filed by James Safechuck, alleging sexual abuse over a four-year period from the age of ten (1988–1992). Both had testified in Jackson's defense during the 1993 allegations; Robson did so again in 2005. In 2015, Robson's case against Jackson's estate was dismissed on the grounds of being filed too late. Safechuck's claim was also time-barred.

In 2017, it was ruled that Jackson's corporations could not be held accountable for his alleged past actions. The rulings were appealed, and on October 20, 2020, Safechuck's lawsuit against Jackson's corporations was again dismissed, with the presiding judge ruling that there was no evidence that Safechuck had a relationship with Jackson's companies, nor was it proven that there was a special relationship between the two. On April 26, 2021, Robson's case was dismissed because of a lack of supporting evidence that the defendants exercised control over Jackson.

Robson and Safechuck described allegations in graphic detail in the documentary Leaving Neverland, released in March 2019. Radio stations in New Zealand, Canada, the UK and the Netherlands removed Jackson's music from their playlists. Jackson's family condemned the film as a "public lynching", and the Jackson estate released a statement calling the film a "tabloid character assassination [Jackson] endured in life, and now in death". Close associates of Jackson, such as Corey Feldman, Aaron Carter, Brett Barnes, and Macaulay Culkin, said that Jackson had not molested them.

Rebuttal documentaries, such as Square One: Michael Jackson, Neverland Firsthand: Investigating the Michael Jackson Documentary and Michael Jackson: Chase the Truth, presented information countering the claims suggested by Leaving Neverland. Jackson's album sales increased following the documentary screenings. Billboard senior editor Gail Mitchell said she and a colleague interviewed about thirty music executives who believed Jackson's legacy could withstand the controversy. In late 2019, some New Zealand and Canadian radio stations re-added Jackson's music to their playlists, citing "positive listener survey results".

On February 21, 2019, the Jackson estate sued HBO for breaching a non-disparagement clause from a 1992 contract. The suit sought to compel HBO to participate in a non-confidential arbitration that could result in $100million or more in damages rewarded to the estate. HBO said they did not breach a contract and filed an anti-SLAPP motion against the estate. In September 2019, Judge George H. Wu denied HBO's motion to dismiss the case, allowing the Jackson estate to arbitrate. HBO appealed, but in December 2020 the appeals court affirmed Wu's ruling.

Legacy

Jackson has been referred to as the "King of Pop" for having transformed the art of music videos and paving the way for modern pop music. For much of Jackson's career, he had an unparalleled worldwide influence over the younger generation. His influence extended beyond the music industry; he impacted dance, led fashion trends, and raised awareness for global affairs. Jackson's music and videos fostered racial diversity in MTV's roster and steered its focus from rock to pop music and R&B, shaping the channel into a form that proved enduring.

In songs such as "Man in the Mirror", "Black or White", Heal the World, "Earth Song" and "They Don't Care About Us", Jackson's music emphasized racial integration and environmentalism and protested injustice. He is recognized as the Most Successful Entertainer of All Time by Guinness World Records. He is considered one of the most significant cultural icons of the 20th century, and his contributions to music, dance, and fashion, along with his publicized personal life, made him a global figure in popular culture for over four decades. Danyel Smith, chief content officer of Vibe Media Group and the editor-in-chief of Vibe, described Jackson as "the greatest star". Steve Huey of AllMusic called him "an unstoppable juggernaut, possessed of all the skills to dominate the charts seemingly at will: an instantly identifiable voice, eye-popping dance moves, stunning musical versatility and loads of sheer star power". BET said Jackson was "quite simply the greatest entertainer of all time" whose "sound, style, movement and legacy continues to inspire artists of all genres".

In 1984, Time pop critic Jay Cocks wrote that "Jackson is the biggest thing since the Beatles. He is the hottest single phenomenon since Elvis Presley. He just may be the most popular black singer ever." He described Jackson as a "star of records, radio, rock video. A one-man rescue team for the music business. A songwriter who sets the beat for a decade. A dancer with the fanciest feet on the street. A singer who cuts across all boundaries of taste and style, and color too." In 2003, The Daily Telegraph writer Tom Utley described Jackson as "extremely important" and a "genius". At Jackson's memorial service on July 7, 2009, Motown founder Berry Gordy called Jackson "the greatest entertainer that ever lived". In a June 28, 2009 Baltimore Sun article, Jill Rosen wrote that Jackson's legacy influenced fields including sound, dance, fashion, music videos and celebrity.

Pop critic Robert Christgau wrote that Jackson's work from the 1970s to the early 1990s showed "immense originality, adaptability, and ambition" with "genius beats, hooks, arrangements, and vocals (though not lyrics)", music that "will stand forever as a reproach to the puritanical notion that pop music is slick or shallow and that's the end of it". During the 1990s, as Jackson lost control of his "troubling life", his music suffered and began to shape "an arc not merely of promise fulfilled and outlived, but of something approaching tragedy: a phenomenally ebullient child star tops himself like none before, only to transmute audibly into a lost weirdo". In the 2000s, Christgau wrote: "Jackson's obsession with fame, his grotesque life magnified by his grotesque wealth, are such an offense to rock aesthetes that the fact that he's a great musician is now often forgotten".

Philanthropy and humanitarian work

Jackson is regarded as a prolific philanthropist and humanitarian. Jackson's early charitable work has been described by The Chronicle of Philanthropy as having "paved the way for the current surge in celebrity philanthropy", and by the Los Angeles Times as having "set the standard for generosity for other entertainers". 

By some estimates, he donated over $500 million, not accounting for inflation, to various charities over the course of his life. The total monetary value of Jackson’s donations may be substantially higher since Jackson often gave anonymously and without fanfare. In addition to supporting several charities established by others, in 1992 Jackson established his Heal the World Foundation, to which he donated several million dollars in revenue from his Dangerous World Tour.

Jackson's philanthropic activities went beyond just monetary donations. He also performed at benefit concerts, some of which he arranged. He gifted tickets for his regular concert performances to groups that assist underprivileged children. He visited sick children in hospitals around the world. He opened his own home for visits by underprivileged or sick children and provided special facilities and nurses if the children needed that level of care.

Jackson donated valuable, personal and professional paraphernalia for numerous charity auctions. He received various awards and accolades for his philanthropic work, including two bestowed by Presidents of the United States. The vast breadth of Jackson’s philanthropic work has earned recognition in the Guinness World Records.

Artistry

Influences 
Jackson was influenced by musicians including James Brown, Little Richard, Jackie Wilson, Diana Ross, Fred Astaire, Sammy Davis Jr., Gene Kelly, and David Ruffin. Little Richard had a substantial influence on Jackson, but Brown was his greatest inspiration; he later said that as a small child, his mother would wake him whenever Brown appeared on television. Jackson described being "mesmerized".

Jackson's vocal technique was influenced by Diana Ross; his use of the oooh interjection from a young age was something Ross had used on many of her songs with the Supremes. She was a mother figure to him, and he often watched her rehearse. He said he had learned a lot from watching how she moved and sang, and that she had encouraged him to have confidence in himself.

Choreographer David Winters, who met Jackson while choreographing the 1971 Diana Ross TV special Diana!, said that Jackson watched the musical West Side Story almost every week, and it was his favorite film; he paid tribute to it in "Beat It" and the "Bad" video.

Vocal style
Jackson sang from childhood, and over time his voice and vocal style changed. Between 1971 and 1975, his voice descended from boy soprano to lyric tenor. He was known for his vocal range. With the arrival of Off the Wall in the late 1970s, Jackson's abilities as a vocalist were well regarded; Rolling Stone compared his vocals to the "breathless, dreamy stutter" of Stevie Wonder, and wrote that "Jackson's feathery-timbred tenor is extraordinarily beautiful. It slides smoothly into a startling falsetto that's used very daringly." By the time of 1982's Thriller, Rolling Stone wrote that Jackson was singing in a "fully adult voice" that was "tinged by sadness".

The turn of the 1990s saw the release of the introspective album Dangerous. The New York Times noted that on some tracks, "he gulps for breath, his voice quivers with anxiety or drops to a desperate whisper, hissing through clenched teeth" and he had a "wretched tone". When singing of brotherhood or self-esteem the musician would return to "smooth" vocals. Of Invincible, Rolling Stone wrote that, at 43, Jackson still performed "exquisitely voiced rhythm tracks and vibrating vocal harmonies". Joseph Vogel notes Jackson's ability to use non-verbal sounds to express emotion. Neil McCormick wrote that Jackson's unorthodox singing style "was original and utterly distinctive".

Musicianship
Jackson had no formal music training and could not read or write music notation. He is credited for playing guitar, keyboard, and drums, but was not proficient in them. When composing, he recorded ideas by beatboxing and imitating instruments vocally. Describing the process, he said: "I'll just sing the bass part into the tape recorder. I'll take that bass lick and put the chords of the melody over the bass lick and that's what inspires the melody." Engineer Robert Hoffman recalled that after Jackson came in with a song he had written overnight, Jackson sang every note of every chord to a guitar player. Hoffman also remembered Jackson singing string arrangements part by part into a cassette recorder.

Dance
Jackson danced from a young age as part of the Jackson 5, and incorporated dance extensively in his performances and music videos. According to Sanjoy Roy of The Guardian, Jackson would "flick and retract his limbs like switchblades, or snap out of a tornado spin into a perfectly poised toe-stand". The moonwalk, taught to him by Jeffrey Daniel, was Jackson's signature dance move and one of the most famous of the 20th century. Jackson is credited for coining the name "moonwalk"; the move was previously known as the "backslide". His other moves included the robot, crotch grab, and the "anti-gravity" lean of the "Smooth Criminal" video.

Themes and genres

Jackson explored genres including pop, soul, rhythm and blues, funk, rock, disco, post-disco, dance-pop and new jack swing. Steve Huey of AllMusic wrote that Thriller refined the strengths of Off the Wall; the dance and rock tracks were more aggressive, while the pop tunes and ballads were softer and more soulful. Its tracks included the ballads "The Lady in My Life", "Human Nature", and "The Girl Is Mine", the funk pieces "Billie Jean" and "Wanna Be Startin' Somethin'", and the disco set "Baby Be Mine" and "P.Y.T. (Pretty Young Thing)".

With Off the Wall, Jackson's "vocabulary of grunts, squeals, hiccups, moans, and asides" vividly showed his maturation into an adult, Robert Christgau wrote in Christgau's Record Guide: Rock Albums of the Seventies (1981). The album's title track suggested to the critic a parallel between Jackson and Stevie Wonder's "oddball" music personas: "Since childhood his main contact with the real world has been on stage and in bed." With Thriller, Christopher Connelly of Rolling Stone commented that Jackson developed his long association with the subliminal theme of paranoia and darker imagery. AllMusic's Stephen Thomas Erlewine noted this on the songs "Billie Jean" and "Wanna Be Startin' Somethin'". In "Billie Jean", Jackson depicts an obsessive fan who alleges he has fathered her child, and in "Wanna Be Startin' Somethin'" he argues against gossip and the media. "Beat It" decried gang violence in a homage to West Side Story, and was Jackson's first successful rock cross-over piece, according to Huey. He observed that "Thriller" began Jackson's interest with the theme of the supernatural, a topic he revisited in subsequent years. In 1985, Jackson co-wrote the charity anthem "We Are the World"; humanitarian themes later became a recurring theme in his lyrics and public persona.In Bad, Jackson's concept of the predatory lover is seen on the rock song "Dirty Diana". The lead single "I Just Can't Stop Loving You" is a traditional love ballad, and "Man in the Mirror" is a ballad of confession and resolution. "Smooth Criminal" is an evocation of bloody assault, rape and likely murder. AllMusic's Stephen Thomas Erlewine states that Dangerous presents Jackson as a paradoxical person. The first half of the record is dedicated to new jack swing, including songs like "Jam" and "Remember the Time". It was the first Jackson album in which social ills became a primary theme; "Why You Wanna Trip on Me", for example, protests world hunger, AIDS, homelessness and drugs. Dangerous contains sexually charged songs such as "In the Closet". The title track continues the theme of the predatory lover and compulsive desire. The second half includes introspective, pop-gospel anthems such as "Will You Be There", "Heal the World" and "Keep the Faith". In the ballad "Gone Too Soon", Jackson gives tribute to Ryan White and the plight of those with AIDS.

HIStory creates an atmosphere of paranoia. In the new jack swing-funk rock tracks "Scream" and "Tabloid Junkie", and the R&B ballad "You Are Not Alone", Jackson retaliates against the injustice and isolation he feels, and directs his anger at the media. In the introspective ballad "Stranger in Moscow", Jackson laments his "fall from grace"; "Earth Song", "Childhood", "Little Susie" and "Smile" are operatic pop songs. In "D.S.", Jackson attacks lawyer Thomas W. Sneddon Jr., who had prosecuted him in both child sexual abuse cases; he describes Sneddon as a white supremacist who wanted to "get my ass, dead or alive". Invincible includes urban soul tracks such as "Cry" and "The Lost Children", ballads such as "Speechless", "Break of Dawn", and "Butterflies" and mixes hip hop, pop, and R&B in "2000 Watts", "Heartbreaker" and "Invincible".

Music videos and choreography

Jackson released "Thriller", a 14-minute music video directed by John Landis, in 1983. The zombie-themed video "defined music videos and broke racial barriers" on MTV, which had launched two years earlier. Before Thriller, Jackson struggled to receive coverage on MTV, allegedly because he was African American. Pressure from CBS Records persuaded MTV to start showing "Billie Jean" and later "Beat It", which led to a lengthy partnership with Jackson, and helped other black music artists gain recognition. The popularity of his videos on MTV helped the relatively new channel's viewing figures, and MTV's focus shifted toward pop and R&B. His performance on Motown 25: Yesterday, Today, Forever changed the scope of live stage shows, making it acceptable for artists to lip-sync to music video on stage. The choreography in Thriller has been copied in Indian films and prisons in the Philippines. Thriller marked an increase in scale for music videos, and was named the most successful music video ever by the Guinness World Records.

In "Bad"'s 19-minute video—directed by Martin Scorsese—Jackson used sexual imagery and choreography, and touched his chest, torso and crotch. When asked by Winfrey in the 1993 interview about why he grabbed his crotch, he said it was spontaneously compelled by the music. Time magazine described the "Bad" video as "infamous". It featured Wesley Snipes; Jackson's later videos often featured famous cameo roles. For the "Smooth Criminal" video, Jackson experimented with leaning forward at a 45 degree angle, beyond the performer's center of gravity. To accomplish this live, Jackson and designers developed a special shoe to lock the performer's feet to the stage, allowing them to lean forward. They were granted  for the device. The video for "Leave Me Alone" was not officially released in the US, but in 1989 was nominated for three Billboard Music Video Awards and won a Golden Lion Award for its special effects. It won a Grammy for Best Music Video, Short Form.

He received the MTV Video Vanguard Award in 1988; in 2001 the award was renamed in his honor. The "Black or White" video simultaneously premiered on November 14, 1991, in 27 countries with an estimated audience of 500million people, the largest audience ever for a music video at the time. Along with Jackson, it featured Macaulay Culkin, Peggy Lipton, and George Wendt. It helped introduce morphing to music videos. It was controversial for scenes in which Jackson rubs his crotch, vandalizes cars, and throws a garbage can through a storefront. He apologized and removed the final scene of the video.

"In the Closet" featured Naomi Campbell in a courtship dance with Jackson. "Remember the Time" was set in ancient Egypt, and featured Eddie Murphy, Iman, and Magic Johnson. The video for "Scream", directed by Mark Romanek and production designer Tom Foden, gained a record 11 MTV Video Music Award Nominations, and won "Best Dance Video", "Best Choreography", and "Best Art Direction". The song and its video are Jackson's response to being accused of child molestation in 1993. A year later, it won a Grammy for Best Music Video, Short Form. It has been reported as the most expensive music video ever made, at $7million; Romanek has contradicted this. The "Earth Song" video was nominated for the 1997 Grammy for Best Music Video, Short Form.

Michael Jackson's Ghosts, a short film written by Jackson and Stephen King and directed by Stan Winston, premiered at the 1996 Cannes Film Festival. At over 38 minutes long, it held the Guinness world record for the longest music video until 2013, when it was eclipsed by the video for the Pharrell Williams song "Happy". The 2001 video for "You Rock My World" lasts over 13 minutes, was directed by Paul Hunter, and features Chris Tucker and Marlon Brando. It won an NAACP Image Award for Outstanding Music Video in 2002.

In December 2009, the Library of Congress selected "Thriller" as the only music video to be preserved in the National Film Registry, as a work of "enduring importance to American culture". Huey wrote that Jackson transformed the music video into an artform and a promotional tool through complex story lines, dance routines, special effects and famous cameos, while breaking down racial barriers.

Honors and awards

Jackson is one of the best-selling music artists in history, with sales estimated by various sources up to 400 million – 1 billion. He had 13 number-one singles in the US in his solo career—more than any other male artist in the Hot 100 era. He was invited and honored by a President of the United States at the White House three times. In 1984, he was honored with a "Presidential Public Safety Commendation" award by Ronald Reagan for his humanitarian endeavors. In 1990, he was honored as the "Artist of the Decade" by George H. W. Bush. In 1992, he was honored as a "Point of Light Ambassador" by Bush for inviting disadvantaged children to his Neverland Ranch.

Jackson won hundreds of awards, making him one of the most-awarded artists in popular music. His awards include 39 Guinness World Records, including the Most Successful Entertainer of All Time, 13 Grammy Awards, as well as the Grammy Legend Award and the Grammy Lifetime Achievement Award, and 26 American Music Awards, including the Artist of the Century and Artist of the 1980s. He also received the World Music Awards' Best-Selling Pop Male Artist of the Millennium and the Bambi Pop Artist of the Millennium Award. Jackson was inducted onto the Hollywood Walk of Fame in 1980 as a member of the Jacksons, and in 1984 as a solo artist. He was inducted to the Rock and Roll Hall of Fame and Vocal Group Hall of Fame as a member of the Jackson 5 in 1997 and 1999, respectively, and again as a solo artist in 2001. In 2002, he was added to the Songwriters Hall of Fame. In 2010, he was the first recording artist to be inducted into the Dance Hall of Fame, and in 2014, he was posthumously inducted into the Rhythm and Blues Music Hall of Fame. In 2021, he was among the inaugural inductees into the Black Music & Entertainment Walk of Fame.

In 1988, Fisk University honored him with an Honorary Doctorate of Humane Letters. In 1992, he was invested as a titular king of Sanwi, a traditional kingdom located in the south-east of Ivory Coast. In July 2009, the Lunar Republic Society named a crater on the Moon after Jackson. In August, for what would have been Jackson's 51st birthday, Google dedicated their Google Doodle to him. In 2012, the extinct hermit crab Mesoparapylocheles michaeljacksoni was named in his honor. In 2014, the British Council of Cultural Relations deemed Jackson's life one of the 80 most important cultural moments of the 20th century. World Vitiligo Day has been celebrated on June 25, the anniversary of Jackson's death, to raise awareness of the auto-immune disorder that Jackson suffered from.

Earnings

In 1989, Jackson's annual earnings from album sales, endorsements, and concerts were estimated at $125million. Forbes placed Jackson's annual income at $35million in 1996 and $20million in 1997. Estimates of Jackson's net worth during his life range from negative $285million to positive $350million for 2002, 2003 and 2007. Forbes reported in August 2018 that Jackson's total career pretax earnings in life and death were $4.2billion. Sales of his recordings through Sony's music unit earned him an estimated $300million in royalties. He may have earned another $400million from concerts, music publishing (including his share of the Beatles catalog), endorsements, merchandising and music videos.

In 2013, the executors of Jackson's estate filed a petition in the United States Tax Court as a result of a dispute with the Internal Revenue Service (IRS) over US federal estate taxes. The executors claim that it was worth about $7million, the IRS that it was worth over $1.1billion. In February 2014, the IRS reported that Jackson's estate owed $702million; $505million in taxes, and $197million in penalties. A trial was held from February 6 to 24, 2017. In 2021, the Tax Court issued a ruling in favor of the estate, ruling that the estate's total combined value of the estate was $111.5 million and that the value of Jackson's name and likeness was $4 million (not the $61 million estimated by the IRS's outside expert witness).

In 2016, Forbes estimated annual gross earnings by the Jackson Estate at $825million, the largest ever recorded for a celebrity, mostly due to the sale of the Sony/ATV catalog. In 2018, the figure was $400million. It was the eighth year since his death that Jackson's annual earnings were reported to be over $100million, thus bringing Jackson's postmortem total to $2.4billion. Forbes has consistently recognized Jackson as one of the top-earning dead celebrities since his death, and placed him at the top spot from 2013 to 2020.

Discography

Got to Be There (1972)
Ben (1972)
Music & Me (1973)
Forever, Michael (1975)
Off the Wall (1979)
Thriller (1982)
Bad (1987)
Dangerous (1991)
HIStory: Past, Present and Future, Book I (1995)
Invincible (2001)

Filmography

The Wiz (1978)
Michael Jackson's Thriller (1983)
Captain EO (1986)
Moonwalker (1988)
Michael Jackson's Ghosts (1997)
Men in Black II (2002)
Miss Cast Away and the Island Girls (2004)
Michael Jackson's This Is It (2009)
Bad 25 (2012)
Michael Jackson's Journey from Motown to Off the Wall (2016)

Tours

Bad (1987–1989)
Dangerous World Tour (1992–1993)
HIStory World Tour (1996–1997)
MJ & Friends (1999)

See also
 List of dancers

Notes

References

Citations

Print sources

Further reading

 How Michael Jackson Changed Dance History – biography.com

External links

Michael Jackson at the FBI's website

 
1958 births
2009 deaths
20th-century American businesspeople
20th-century American singers
21st-century American businesspeople
21st-century American singers
Accidental deaths in California
African-American businesspeople
African-American choreographers
African-American male dancers
African-American male singers
African-American record producers
African-American rock singers
African-American songwriters
American beatboxers
American child singers
American choreographers
American dance musicians
American disco singers
American expatriates in Ireland
American funk singers
American humanitarians
American male dancers
American male pop singers
American male singers
American male songwriters
American manslaughter victims
American multi-instrumentalists
American nonprofit businesspeople
American philanthropists
American rhythm and blues singers
American rock singers
American rock songwriters
American soul singers
American tenors
Boy sopranos
Brit Award winners
Burials at Forest Lawn Memorial Park (Glendale)
Businesspeople from California
Businesspeople from Indiana
Child pop musicians
Culture of Gary, Indiana
Dance-pop musicians
Dancers from California
Dancers from Indiana
Drug-related deaths in California
Epic Records artists
Former Jehovah's Witnesses
Grammy Award winners
Grammy Legend Award winners
Grammy Lifetime Achievement Award winners
History of Gary, Indiana
Michael Jackson
Modern dancers
Motown artists
MTV Europe Music Award winners
Music video codirectors
Musicians from Gary, Indiana
New jack swing musicians
People acquitted of sex crimes
People from Santa Barbara County, California
People from Holmby Hills, Los Angeles
People with lupus
People with vitiligo
Post-disco musicians
Presley family
Record producers from California
Record producers from Indiana
Singers from California
Singers from Indiana
Songwriters from California
Songwriters from Indiana
The Jackson 5 members
World Music Awards winners
World record holders
Writers from California
Writers from Gary, Indiana